The Sociedade Esportiva e Recreativa Chapadão, usually known as SERC, or simply as Chapadão, is a Brazilian football club based in Chapadão do Sul in the state of Mato Grosso do Sul. The club was established in 1981 and competed in the Campeonato Brasileiro Série C in 2003 and in 2004.

Achievements
 Campeonato Sul-Matogrossense: 1995, 2003

References

External links
 Sociedade Esportiva e Recreativa Chapadão official website

Association football clubs established in 1981
Football clubs in Mato Grosso do Sul
1981 establishments in Brazil